The COVID-19 pandemic was confirmed to have reached Sevastopol in March 2020. The Russian government includes the cases in Sevastopol in the count of cases in Russia (the city is recognised as a part of Ukraine by most of the international community but occupied by Russia).

Background 
On 12 January 2020, the World Health Organization (WHO) confirmed that a novel coronavirus was the cause of a respiratory illness in a cluster of people in Wuhan City, Hubei Province, China, which was reported to the WHO on 31 December 2019.

The case fatality ratio for COVID-19 has been much lower than SARS of 2003, but the transmission has been significantly greater, with a significant total death toll.

Timeline

March 2020
As of 30 March 2020, there were five confirmed cases in Sevastopol.

See also
 COVID-19 pandemic in Crimea
 COVID-19 pandemic in Russia
 COVID-19 pandemic in Ukraine

References

Sevastopol
Sevastopol
Sevastopol
Sevastopol
History of Sevastopol
Disasters in Crimea
2020 in Russia
2020 in Ukraine
2021 in Russia
2021 in Ukraine